West Feliciana Parish (French: Paroisse de Feliciana Ouest; Spanish: Parroquia de Feliciana Occidental) is a civil parish located in the U.S. state of Louisiana. At the 2020 census, the population was 15,310. The parish seat is St. Francisville. The parish was established in 1824.

In 1824 Feliciana Parish was divided into East Feliciana Parish and West Feliciana Parish, in recognition of the increases in population throughout the parish. West Feliciana Parish is part of the Baton Rouge metropolitan statistical area.

The River Bend Nuclear Generating Station, operated by Entergy Nuclear, is located in West Feliciana Parish below St. Francisville. It produces approximately 10 percent of the total electric power demand in Louisiana. The Louisiana State Penitentiary is also located in the parish, in Angola. It occupies 18,000 acres at a site in a river bend, surrounded on three sides by water.

History

18th and 19th centuries
Following the founding of the Bayou Sara settlement by French Franciscan/Capuchin monks in the late 17th century, the area was explored further by France, Spain, and Great Britain. The original settlement was flooded repeatedly and finally lost to the waters of the Mississippi River.

After 1763, when France was defeated by Britain in the Seven Years' War, it ceded its territories of La Louisiane east of the Mississippi River to Great Britain, which included it in its West Florida province. Spain gained control of the area in about 1780 – during the American Revolutionary War – and maintained its authority in the area for the next three decades.

In 1810, the colonists, many of whom were of British descent, rebelled against the Spanish colonial regime and established the short-lived independent Republic of West Florida.  Within a few months, the United States declared the area to be part of the territory included in the Louisiana Purchase of 1803. (Today this region is called the Florida Parishes).

Feliciana Parish was established in 1810, in the Territory of Orleans, which was admitted to the Union two years later as the state of Louisiana. With continued growth of population, in 1824 Feliciana Parish was divided into the East Feliciana and West Feliciana parishes.

During the American Civil War, West Feliciana Parish provided financial assistance to the families of soldiers fighting for the Confederate States of America. Wives and children of soldiers were to receive from $10 to $40 per month, depending on family size.

West Feliciana and national politics

Since before the Civil War, white conservative voters in West Feliciana historically supported the Democratic Party. After Louisiana effectively disenfranchised most black voters under provisions of its 1898 constitution, the state joined others in the South as being a one-party state. The white-dominated legislature passed increasingly stringent Jim Crow and segregation legislation.

But after passage of Federal civil rights legislation in the mid-1960s, including protection of constitutional voting rights, many white conservatives in the South began to shift to the Republican Party, at least in terms of supporting Presidential candidates. In 1972, the year of Richard Nixon's re-election as President, after widespread anti-war protests and other cultural changes, West Feliciana was the only Louisiana parish to support the Democratic ticket of George McGovern and Sargent Shriver. During the same period, most African Americans in the South began to support the national Democratic Party, which had helped their drive for civil rights.

Since 2000, voters in the parish have supported the Republican Party candidates in Presidential elections.  That year Bush-Cheney polled 2,512 votes (55 percent), compared to 2,187 (45 percent) for Democrats Al Gore and Joe Lieberman. West Feliciana voters helped to re-elect George W. Bush and Dick Cheney in 2004, with 2,932 (56 percent) to 2,214 (42 percent) over Democratic candidates John Kerry and John Edwards. Republicans John McCain and Sarah Palin won the parish in 2008, but they lost the Presidential/Vice-Presidential contest to Democrats Barack Obama and Joe Biden.

Geography

The parish is located on the Mississippi River, and is bordered by Pointe Coupee Parish to the west and East Feliciana Parish to the east.

The area—including references to the loess soil and Louisiana State Penitentiary—was used by author Walker Percy as the setting for his last novel, The Thanatos Syndrome.

Major highways
  U.S. Highway 61
  Louisiana Highway 10
  Louisiana Highway 66

Adjacent parishes and counties
 Wilkinson County, Mississippi (north)
 East Feliciana Parish (east)
 East Baton Rouge Parish (south)
 West Baton Rouge Parish (south)
 Pointe Coupee Parish (southwest)
 Avoyelles Parish (northwest)
 Concordia Parish (northwest)

National protected area
 Cat Island National Wildlife Refuge

Communities

Town 

 St. Francisville (parish seat and only municipality)

Unincorporated communities 
 Louisiana State Penitentiary (Angola)
 Bains
 Tunica
 Wakefield

Demographics

As of the 2020 United States census, there were 15,310 people, 3,869 households, and 2,497 families residing in the parish. The 2019 American Community Survey estimated 15,428 people lived in the parish, down from 15,625 at the 2010 United States census, and up from 15,111 at the 2000 U.S. census. Among the population, the median age was 41.4. In 2000, the parish the population was spread out, with 20.30% under the age of 18, 8.70% from 18 to 24, 40.00% from 25 to 44, 23.80% from 45 to 64, and 7.20% who were 65 years of age or older.  The median age was 37 years. For every 100 females, there were 191.10 males. For every 100 females age 18 and over, there were 223.60 males.

The racial and ethnic makeup was 53.5% non-Hispanic white, 44.5% Black and African American, 0.2% American Indian and Alaska Native, 0.6% Asian alone, 0.1% some other race, 1.1% two or more races, and 1.2% Hispanic and Latin American of any race. In 2000, the racial makeup of the parish was 50.51% Black or African American, 48.63% White, 0.20% Native American, 0.17% Asian, 0.02% Pacific Islander, 0.03% from other races, and 0.44% from two or more races; 1.04% of the population were Hispanic or Latin American of any race.

In 2019, there were 3,869 households and 5,446 housing units. The parish had a home-ownership rate of 73.2%, and the median housing value was $229,500. Median gross rent was $785, and the median household income was $59,637. Approximately 23.6% of the population lived at or below the poverty line. At the 2000 census, the median income for a household in the parish was $39,667, and the median income for a family was $47,239. Males had a median income of $35,046 versus $21,922 for females. The per capita income for the parish was $16,201. About 15.00% of families and 19.90% of the population were below the poverty line, including 25.30% of those under age 18 and 23.40% of those age 65 or over.

In January 2007, the state of Louisiana estimated that 15,318 people lived in the parish, with 5,000 of them being prisoners at Louisiana State Penitentiary (Angola).

Government and infrastructure
Louisiana State Penitentiary of the Louisiana Department of Public Safety and Corrections is located in unincorporated West Feliciana Parish.

Education

West Feliciana Parish Public Schools serves the parish. All residents are zoned to Bains Lower Elementary School, Bains Elementary School, West Feliciana Middle School, and West Feliciana High School. Tunica Elementary School, a parish elementary school, was closed after the parish school board voted to close the school in May 2011.

Some students in the parish attend Wilkinson County Christian Academy in Wilkinson County, Mississippi.

The West Feliciana Parish Library is located in St. Francisville. The library, previously a part of the Audubon Regional Library System, became independent in January 2004.

The parish's proximity to Baton Rouge offers access to Louisiana State University, Southern University, and Baton Rouge Community College. It is in the service area of Baton Rouge Community College.

News media
Founded in 1892, the St. Francisville Democrat was the parish's local newspaper and served as the official journal for the parish's governmental bodies.  The paper, founded by W. W. Leake and his wife May, was originally called "The True Democrat." After Leake's death, May Leake married Elrie Robinson and they continued publication of the newspaper. After May's death in the 1920s, Robinson remarried. The paper was later published by Elrie's son James M. Robinson, who sold it to Marilyn and David Goff in the 1970s. The newspaper was bought by Louisiana Suburban Press in 1979. Louisiana Suburban Press is part of Louisiana State Newspapers, owned by B.I Moody.

On October 1, 2014, the Democrat was sold by Louisiana State Newspapers to Capital City Press Inc., owner of The Advocate (a major newspaper of Baton Rouge) and of other newspapers in the region.

The Feliciana Explorer is an independent publication mailed to residents of East and West Feliciana. It is owned and published by Daniel Duggan, who also owns the Zachary Post.

Founded in 1976, The Angolite is a news magazine created and published at the Louisiana State Penitentiary. Each year, it publishes six issues.

Notable people
 General Robert Hilliard Barrow, the 27th Commandant of the United States Marine Corps (USMC) from 1979 to 1983.
 Cheston Folkes, Louisiana state representative from West Feliciana Parish, 1908–1920, 1924–1932, and 1936–1940
 John Richard Rarick, attorney and U.S. Representative from St. Francisville.
 Major Thibaut, state representative since 2008 for District 18, which includes West Feliciana Parish
 Sheadrick Turner (1869–1927), Illinois state representative, newspaper editor, and lawyer

See also

 Louisiana State Penitentiary
 National Register of Historic Places listings in West Feliciana Parish, Louisiana
 River Bend Nuclear Generating Station
 Louisville, New Orleans and Texas RailwayWest Feliciana Railway

References

External links

 West Feliciana Historical Society Museum.
 West Feliciana Tourist Commission
 Explore the History and Culture of Southeastern Louisiana, a National Park Service Discover Our Shared Heritage Travel Itinerary
 West Feliciana Parish Sheriff's Office
 West Feliciana Digital History Archive

 
Louisiana parishes
Baton Rouge metropolitan area
Louisiana parishes on the Mississippi River
1824 establishments in Louisiana
Populated places established in 1824